Charles Gerrit DeWitt (November 7, 1789 – April 12, 1839) was an American lawyer and politician from the U.S. state of New York. He served as a member of the United States House of Representatives and as United States Chargé d'Affaires to Guatemala.

Early life
DeWitt was born in Kingston, New York. He studied law and began the practice of law in Kingston. He was a clerk in the Navy Department and published a newspaper, The Ulster Sentinel, beginning in 1826.

Political career
He represented New York's 7th district as a Jacksonian in the 21st Congress, serving from March 4, 1829, to March 3, 1831. After leaving Congress he resumed the practice of law. On March 22, 1831, he was appointed by Secretary of the Treasury Samuel D. Ingham as one of three Commissioners of Insolvency for the Southern District of New York. He was appointed United States Chargé d'Affaires to Guatemala in 1833, and served in that position until 1839.

DeWitt committed suicide on board a steamboat in Newburgh, New York on April 12, 1839, and is interred in the Dutch Reformed Cemetery in Hurley, New York.

Family life
DeWitt's father Gerrit DeWitt was a miller, and his grandfather Charles DeWitt was a delegate to the Continental Congress. His great-nephew Henry Richard DeWitt was a New York state assemblyman.

Notes

External links
 

	

1789 births
1839 deaths
Ambassadors of the United States to Guatemala
Politicians from Kingston, New York
19th-century American diplomats
Jacksonian members of the United States House of Representatives from New York (state)
American newspaper publishers (people)
19th-century American politicians
De Witt family

Members of the United States House of Representatives from New York (state)